Christmas Is Almost Here is the 19th studio album, and first Christmas album, by American singer-songwriter Carly Simon, released by Rhino Entertainment, on October 22, 2002.

Featuring a mixture of seasonal classics and original compositions, the album features Willie Nelson in a duet on "Pretty Paper", and Simon's son Ben Taylor in a duet on "God Rest Ye Merry, Gentlemen". Simon's former brother-in-law Livingston Taylor wrote the title track. Simon co-wrote the track "Heaven" with her sister Lucy Simon. "The Land of Christmas (Mary)" was written by Simon the night before recording on the album began.

The album peaked at No. 14 on the U.S. Billboard Top Holiday Albums chart. Simon embarked on a promotional tour in support of the album that included a handful of television appearances, including Good Morning America, The Caroline Rhea Show, Live with Regis and Kelly, Howard Stern, and The Today Show. Simon's son, Ben Taylor, accompanied her on many of these promotional appearances.

Reception

Writing for AllMusic, Richie Unterberger rated the album 2-stars-out-of-5, and wrote "Christmas albums by major veteran pop stars long past their commercial prime are usually not highlights of their catalogs, and for the most part this isn't an exception", but "this is definitely an above-average holiday offering. Don Was' presence as co-producer ensures some creativity and diversity to the sound, as do the contributions of top session players like Jim Keltner, Billy Preston, and Benmont Tench. Simon's vocals are strong, and one of the two originals, "The Land of Christmas (Mary)," is not only pretty straight-ahead and gutsy, but sounds a lot better than most of the contemporary material she did on her secular records in the 1980s and 1990s. It's not an exciting release by any means, but it's not as immediately forgettable as many holiday efforts by similar performers are."

Entertainment Weekly stated "Simon's always had a rueful streak, and this CD's spartan arrangements don't lend much cheer. But who's complaining? The singer's own "The Land of Christmas (Mary)" recalls classic Carly. And Willie Nelson's "Pretty Paper" is a beautifully understated duet. But occasional odd touches (an electric Dobro renders "O Come, All Ye Faithful" eerie) make it only Almost perfect."

Release history
Simon re-released the album the following year with two bonus tracks: "White Christmas" (with Burt Bacharach) and "Forgive" (with Andreas Vollenweider). These two tracks were also released together as a CD single.

Borders released special limited copies in 2010 with the bonus track "The Night Before Christmas", from Simon's soundtrack album to the 1992 film This Is My Life. The previous year the song had been added to the MP3 version of the album.

Track listings

Original 2002 release
Credits adapted from the album's liner notes.

Expanded 2003 re-release
Credits adapted from the album's liner notes.

Notes
 signifies a writer by additional lyrics

Personnel

Musicians

Production

Charts
Album – Billboard (United States)

References

External links
 Carly Simon's Official Website
 Christmas Is Almost Here at Carlysimon.com

Carly Simon albums
Rhino Records albums
Albums produced by Don Was
Christmas albums by American artists
2002 Christmas albums
Pop Christmas albums